St. Simons Sound is a sound in Georgia that prevails between Jekyll Island and St. Simons Island.  It is part of the waterway from the Atlantic Ocean to the South Brunswick River to the port at Brunswick, Georgia. The St. Simons lighthouse stands on the north side of the sound. The depth of the sound is determined to be  through a channel of treacherous shoals.

References

Bodies of water of Glynn County, Georgia
Bodies of water of Georgia (U.S. state)
Sounds of the United States